Viscosity (commonly perceived as "thickness", or resistance to pouring) is the measure of the resistance of a fluid to deform under either shear stress or extensional stress.

Viscosity can also refer to:
 A cognitive dimension for the design of notations measuring resistance to change.
 Viscosity (programming) - a concept in object oriented programming, which refers to the ease at which a developer can add design-preserving code to a system.